Scotland County is a county located in the southern part of the U.S. state of North Carolina and is its smallest county by area. Its county seat is and largest city is Laurinburg. The county was formed in 1899 from part of Richmond County and named in honor of the Scottish settlers who occupied the area in the 1700s. As of the 2020 census, its population was 34,174. 

The area eventually comprising Scotland was originally inhabited by Native Americans and was settled by Europeans as early as the 1720s, though settling heavily increased after the American Revolutionary War. Scotland County was created out of Richmond in 1899 largely for political reasons. The area began to industrialize at the turn of the century but suffered heavily during the Great Depression. Industrialization increased after World War II as agriculture mechanized. In the 2000s, the county's economy suffered a major downturn due to the departure of textile manufacturers and the Great Recession. The economy continues to struggle in the area and the county regularly suffers from one of the state's highest unemployment rates.

History

Early history 
The earliest residents of the land which became Scotland County were Cheraw Native Americans. Scottish Highlanders and some English Quakers began colonizing the area as early as the 1720s when it was within the British Province of North Carolina. The land encompassing Scotland County was originally under the jurisdiction of Bladen County. As North Carolina grew, its original counties were subdivided and the future Scotland portion was placed in the new Anson County. The relevant portion was then moved into the new Richmond County in 1779. Richmond County was bisected by the Sandhills, leaving the eastern portion of future Scotland geographically separated from the rest of the county.

More immigrants came after the American Revolutionary War, especially one large group of Highland Scots which came from the Cape Fear River. The group split and settled two areas in the county, Johns and Laurel Hill, the latter in the vicinity of the Laurel Hill Presbyterian Church, established in 1797. Laurel Hill became the first major community in the region, prospering as a post-revolution trading center. More immigrants settled the area at this time, including Germans, Welsh, English, and Ulster Scots. Enslaved Africans were also brought into the area. The Laurel Hill community largely moved south in 1861 after the Wilmington, Charlotte and Rutherford Railroad laid a line through the area. Gaelic was spoken in the area through the 1860s.

During the American Civil War, the railroad's shops were moved to Laurinburg in the hope they would be safer from Union Army attack; however, in March 1865, Union forces reached Laurinburg and burned the railroad depot and temporary shops. The shops were rebuilt after the war, though economic recovery was slow. Laurinburg was incorporated in 1877. It continued to develop as a railway town until 1894 when the shops were moved.

Creation 

By the late 1800s Richmond County had a majority black population and tended to support the Republican Party in elections, while the state of North Carolina was typically dominated by the Democratic Party. In response to this, white Democrats built up a political base in Laurinburg. Legislator Maxey John introduced several unsuccessful bills in the North Carolina General Assembly to carve out a new county around Laurinburg between 1893 and 1897. During the state legislative elections of 1898, Democrats organized intensely in the area to unseat the statewide Fusionist coalition of state Republicans and Populists, including the deployment of paramilitary Red Shirts in Laurinburg to intimidate black residents and other opponents at the polls. Democrats regained a majority in the General Assembly. In tribute to the efforts of Democrats in Laurinburg, on February 20, 1899, the assembly split off the town and the surrounding area from Richmond County and created the new Scotland County, named in homage to the Scottish settlers. Laurinburg was designated the county seat.

Scotland County began operating as an effective unit of government on December 10, 1900. The first courthouse was erected in Laurinburg the following year. At its creation, the county was socially and politically dominated by its resident white planter class and businessmen. No black people were allowed to register to vote again until 1928. The county's first cotton mill was built in 1899. In subsequent years additional textile mills were established, as was a cotton oil mill, a flour mill, and a fertilizer plant. A county road law was passed by the state in 1903, leading the county to construct its first improved roads of sand and clay. Another road law passed six years later led the county to greatly increase its road building program and erect its first concrete bridges.

Great Depression 

Scotland's black population increased in the 1910s and early 1920s as tenant cotton farmers moved north from the Deep South to escape areas infested by the boll weevil. County cotton production peaked in 1920 as farmers diversified their operations and began growing fruits and melons. Cotton nevertheless remained the dominant crop through the 1920s despite stagnating prices. The area suffered heavily during the Great Depression, as two banks in Laurinburg failed and a state report indicated that one fourth of the local population was destitute. Many smallholding farmers lost their lands in foreclosures and bankruptcies. The county nonwhite population dropped, and urbanization increased as people relocated to towns. In May 1934, 500 workers at textile mills in East Laurinburg went on strike in protest of work conditions and living conditions in their company-provided housing. The strike gained state-wide media attention after the strikers engaged in a brawl with loyalist workers, with nine people wounded by gunfire, before the dispute was resolved by arbitration. The United States Resettlement Administration purchased much of the low-quality land in the sandhills portion of the county and turned it into a recreational area. The federal Agricultural Adjustment Act and Soil Conservation and Domestic Allotment Act of 1936 incentivized landowners to reduce production and, as a result, many tenant farmers and sharecroppers were put out of work and migrated north in search of employment.

World War II and aftermath 
During World War II, the United States government established Camp Mackall in the Sandhills portion of Scotland County to train paratroopers and the Laurinburg–Maxton Army Air Base in the east to train glider pilots. The latter facility was used to train about 30,000 personnel. Many local residents worked in civilian capacities at the base, which provided them with a secure source of income. It closed in October 1945 and was turned into a civilian airport. Mechanization of agriculture in the 1950s led to depopulation in rural areas, as former farm laborers moved to Laurinburg, Wagram, and outside the county in search of new jobs; from 1950 to 1960, the population decreased by over 1,100 people. Much agricultural land was retired through the Soil Bank Program, and tenant farming and sharecropping rapidly declined. Agriculture continued to mechanize and consolidate into the 1970s.

Faced with the decline in agricultural employment, county leaders in the postwar era appealed for state and federal grants to improve local infrastructure and attract outside industry. Funds were acquired to build low-income housing, pave roads, and support the creation of a new hospital. The first outsider-owned manufacturing plant began operations in Scotland in 1959. A new courthouse was built in 1964. The county and Laurinburg school system were merged and racially integrated in the late 1960s.

In the 2000s, the county's economy suffered a major downturn due to the departure of textile manufacturers. The Great Recession led to the closure and shrinking of other manufacturing businesses, leading its employment rate to peak at 18.6 percent in July 2011. In 2018, the county was heavily impacted by Hurricane Florence.

Geography

Located within the southeastern portion of the state of North Carolina, Scotland County rests at the border between the Coastal Plain and Piedmont regions. It is bordered by Hoke, Robeson, Richmond, and Moore counties, and the state of South Carolina. It is the smallest North Carolina county by area.

Scotland is one of the state's ten counties within the Sandhills region. The hills mostly populate the northern section of the county, with rest being largely flat. Geologically, most of the soil in Scotland consists of sand, sandstone, and mudstone, with the sandiest soils in the Sandhills. The extreme western portion of the county is in the Pee Dee River drainage basin, while the rest is in the Lumber River basin. The Lumber forms the eastern boundary of the county. Several smaller tributary watercourses, including Big Shoe Heel Creek, Juniper Creek, Jordan Creek, Leith Creek, Gum Swamp Creek, and Joes Creek, flow across the area and into the Lumber. Most such streams are blackwater and flow southward or southeastward. The county is also populated by several hundred Carolina bays, most of which are concentrated in the northeast, east, and just south of Laurinburg. Some of these form seasonal ponds, and there are several other manmade bodies of water including millponds. 

The region generally experiences mild winters and hot summers. Native trees include loblolly pine, sweetgum, red maple, and water oak. Longleaf pine grows in the Sandhills Game Land, a state nature preserve which covers part of Scotland County. The Sandhills region is also populated by fox squirrels. Other fauna in the county include Carolina gopher frogs, eastern tiger salamanders, and loggerhead shrikes. Portions of the Lumber River State Park are also in the county.

Demographics

2020 census
As of the 2020 United States census, there were 34,174 people, Laurinburg recorded 15,024 residents. Racially, 14,402 county residents identified as white, 13,162 identified as black or African American, 3,745 identified as American Indian, 343 identified as Asian, and 15 identified as Native Hawaiian or Pacific Islander, 718 identified as other, and 1,789 identified as two or more races. Of the total among the races, 1,106 people identified as Hispanic or Latino. Scotland proportionately has the third-largest Native American population of any North Carolina county at 14 percent.

Scotland County is included in the Fayetteville–Lumberton–Laurinburg, NC Combined Statistical Area.

Demographic change

Scotland County has long had significant white, black, and Lumbee Indian populations. The Hispanic population grew in the early 21st century. From 2010 to 2020, Scotland County's population declined from 36,157 to 34,174, a decrease of about five percent. The proportion of county residents under the age of 18 dropped by 19.2 percent. According to the American Community Survey, from 2017 to 2021 there were an estimated 12,214 households in the county with an average of 2.65 persons per household.

Law and government

Government 
Scotland County is governed by a county commission. The commission is funded by a 2 percent share of local sales tax revenue and the local property tax. The county charges the highest property tax rate in the state, 0.99 percent. A third of the county's land is owned by the United States Forestry Service and the United States Armed Forces, from whom no tax revenue is collected. The armed forces operate the Luzon Drop Zone military airfield and Camp Mackall in the county (the latter only partially).

Scotland County is a member of the Lumber River Council of Governments, a regional planning board representing five counties. It is located entirely in North Carolina's 9th congressional district and is also included in the North Carolina Senate's 24th district and the North Carolina House of Representatives' 48th district. It is one of the four counties within the jurisdiction of the Lumbee Tribe of North Carolina, and tribal members within the county elect some members of the tribal council.

Law enforcement and judicial system
Scotland County lies within the bounds of North Carolina's 21st Prosecutorial District, the 16A Superior Court District, and the 16A District Court District. County voters elect a sheriff. The sheriff's office provides law enforcement in the unincorporated areas of the county, maintains the Scotland County Detention Center, and provides security at the Scotland County Courthouse.

Politics

As of 2022, Scotland County is home to about 20,600 registered voters, of whom 10,000 are registered Democrats, 4,200 are registered Republicans and 6,300 are unaffiliated. While the county has historically voted for Democratic candidates, in recent years it has become a swing county. Democratic voter registration shares declined from 58 percent of the county's registered voters in 2016 to 48 percent in 2022, while Republican and unaffiliated voter registration rates increased.

Economy
Scotland County's economy is largely based in agriculture. Area farmers mostly grow corn, cotton, tobacco, and soybeans, and raise hogs. Forestry products including lumber and paper are also sourced in the county. Manufacturing firms increased in the county after 1950. The local manufacturing industry produces textiles, cabinet accessories, mobile homes, hospital equipment, and automotive parts. Following a national trend, manufacturing—especially in textiles—has declined since 2000, damaging the economy of the county. In the early 2020s retail grew along the U.S. Route 74 corridor. As of 2022, manufacturing remains the highest-employing sector in the county. The North Carolina Department of Commerce classifies Scotland as one of the state's most economically distressed counties and it has long suffered from one of North Carolina's highest unemployment rates. According to the American Community Survey, from 2017 to 2021 the estimated median household income was $39,866. The child poverty rate is 46 percent.

Transportation 
Scotland County is served by Interstate 74 (undesignated, currently Future I-74), U.S. Route 15 (Bus.), US 74 (Bus.), US 401 (Bus.), US 501, North Carolina Highway 71, NC 79, NC 44, and NC 381. County government supports a public transport bus service, the Scotland County Area Transit System. Airplane facilities are provided by the Laurinburg–Maxton Airport. Local railways are operated by CSX Transportation and the Laurinburg and Southern Railroad. The longest straight stretch of railroad track in the United States, spanning 78.86 miles, connects Wilmington to the east with the Scotland community of Old Hundred.

Education 
Scotland County Schools operates public schools in the area. As of 2022, the system operates 10 schools and serves 5,592 students. The district was classified by the North Carolina Department of Public Instruction as low-performing in 2021 but its rank improved passed low-performing status in 2022. The county hosts a satellite campus of the Richmond Community College and St. Andrews University, a private liberal arts school. According to the 2021 American Community Survey, an estimated 15.3 percent of county residents have attained a bachelor's degree or higher level of education.

Healthcare 
Scotland County is served by a single hospital, Scotland Health Care System, based in Laurinburg. According to the 2022 County Health Rankings produced by the University of Wisconsin Population Health Institute, Scotland County ranked 98th in health outcomes of North Carolina's 100 counties. Per the ranking, 28 percent of adults say they are in poor or fair health, the average life expectancy is 73 years, and 14 percent of people under the age of 65 lack health insurance.

Culture 

Many surnames, streets, and places in Scotland County reflect Scottish origins. Since 2008, the county has hosted an annual Scotland County Highland Games festival in homage to the heavy Scottish ancestry of its population. The Scotland County High School's sports teams are called the Fighting Scots and the school marching band wears traditional Scottish garb, including kilts, sporrans, plaid shawls, and Glengarry bonnets. The county also hosts an annual Kuumba festival to celebrate African American heritage. Several area buildings and sites have been listed on the National Register of Historic Places. Religion is a key part of local public life. Fishing is a popular recreational activity.

Communities

City
 Laurinburg (county seat and largest city)

Towns

 Gibson
 Maxton (partially)
 Wagram

Census-designated places
 Deercroft
 Laurel Hill
 Old Hundred
 Scotch Meadows

Other unincorporated communities
 East Laurinburg
 Montclair

Townships
 Laurel Hill
 Spring Hill
 Stewartsville
 Williamson

See also
 List of counties in North Carolina

References

Works cited

External links

 
 

 
Scottish-American culture in North Carolina
1899 establishments in North Carolina
Populated places established in 1899
Majority-minority counties in North Carolina